Koury may refer to:

Koury Corporation, company of North Carolina
Allan Koury, Canadian politician
Maurice J Koury, textile entrepreneur founder of Carolina Hosiery
Frederick J. Koury, founder of City-as-School high school
Louise Koury Alley, American radio personality
Sadie Koury, founder of Sadie's restaurant chain
Rex Koury, music theme composer of TV show Gunsmoke
Karyn Khoury, American perfumer
Koury, Mali

See also 
Khoury, a surname
Coury, a surname
Kouri (disambiguation)